Our Pain, Your Gain is the first live DVD release by New York-based punk band Mindless Self Indulgence, released on September 11, 2007. The DVD is compiled from three shows the band played at New York, New York's Webster Hall in July 2005.

Track listing
 "The End" – 1:58
 "Begin Already!" – 0:46
 "Faggot" – 2:04
 "Dicks" (a.k.a. "Dicks Are for My Friends") – 1:19
 "Clarissa" – 1:55
 "One Word" – 0:24
 "Shut Me Up" – 2:54
 "Revenge" – 2:16
 "Backmask" – 2:23
 "1989" – 2:14
 "Golden I" – 2:10
 "Word" – 0:34
 "Stupid MF" – 2:33
 "2 Hookers" (a.k.a. "2 Hookers & An Eightball") – 2:30
 "What Do They Know?" – 3:07
 "Planet of the Apes" – 2:20
 "Capitol P" – 2:17
 "Position" – 0:43
 "Prom" – 2:26
 "Uncle"– 3:10
 "7-11" – 1:35
 "Bring The Pain" – 4:01
 "I Hate Jimmy Page" – 2:55
 "Tom Sawyer" – 3:01
 "Song" – 0:29
 "Kill the Rock" – 2:03
 "Bullshit" – 3:02
 "Straight to Video" – 3:37
 "Bitches" – 3:29
 "Scissors" – 4:08

The songs are available on the following albums:

Bonus features
The DVD also includes the music video for "Shut Me Up" (both the original and final versions) plus storyboards and a "making of" slideshow, the music video for "Straight to Video" plus a "making of" slide show, plus two fan-made videos by: 

Bjaw Bjaw Productions:
Cast:
Directors: Zak Keck, Alex Morrison
Editing: Alex Morrison, Zak Keck
Camerawork: Zak Keck, Alex Morrison, Stewart Morrison, Ty Prieto, Jake Deschamps, Calvin Kuntze
Actors (in order of appearance:( Alex Morrison, Zak Keck, Ty Prieto, Scott Orzech, Audrey Webb, Brian Wan, Jake Deschamps, Krista Kutlik, Emily Walsh, Bernard Viray )

Video produced and funded by Bjaw Bjaw Productions.

"Happy Fun Rand" Video by Stewart Morrison and Ty Prieto

And Mike Diva:

Written, directed, and edited by: Mike Dahlquist

Starring: Mike Dahlquist and Maxx Jamez

Shot by: John Mijares

Special thanks to: Jeff Miller

References
MSI discography

Mindless Self Indulgence albums
2007 live albums
Live video albums
2007 video albums